Blair is an unincorporated community in Doniphan County, Kansas, United States.

History
A post office was opened in Blair in 1908, and remained in operation until it was discontinued in 1957.

Education
The community is served by Riverside USD 114 public school district.

References

Further reading

External links
 Doniphan County maps: Current, Historic, KDOT

Unincorporated communities in Doniphan County, Kansas
Unincorporated communities in Kansas
1908 establishments in Kansas